Ben Scott Jacobson (born December 16, 1970) is an American basketball coach.  He is the head men's basketball coach at the University of Northern Iowa, a position he has held since 2006. He served as an assistant at North Dakota, North Dakota State, and Northern Iowa before taking over as head coach at Northern Iowa in 2006.

Playing career
Jacobson attended Mayville-Portland High School. After his senior year he was named 1989's North Dakota Mr. Basketball. Jacobson went on to play collegiately at the University of North Dakota from 1989 to 1993. He was a four-year letterman for the Sioux, a two-year starter, and he ended his career as the school's all-time assist leader. UND made two Division 2 Elite Eight appearances and four regional appearances, along with winning two conference championships, during his career. He was team captain in 1991-92 and 1992–93, was named to the NCC's All-Academic Team in 1993, and was a player representative to UND's letterwinner's association from 1991-93.

Coaching career

Jacobson's biggest coaching accomplishment was in 2009–10, when the Panthers made a run into the Sweet Sixteen of the NCAA tournament highlighted by an upset of top national seed Kansas. ESPN.com columnist Pat Forde called the Panthers' win "the biggest tourney upset in years," and called the clinching shot by Panthers guard Ali Farokhmanesh "the greatest early-round shot in NCAA tournament history."

In March 2010, Jacobson signed a 10-year extension with UNI. The contract guarantees the coach $450,000 a year with annual increases of $25,000 through the length of the contract.

In the 2010-11 season, Jacobson led the Panthers to their eighth consecutive 18-plus win season, third straight postseason bid and a Valley-leading third straight 20-plus win season.

Prior to that stretch of eight straight seasons, UNI had tallied only six 18-plus win seasons in the history of its program.

Jacobson also coached UNI as it became the first college program ever to represent the United States of America at an international basketball competition. In August 2007, UNI was chosen to be Team USA at the World University Games in Bangkok, Thailand. Donning the Red, White and Blue, UNI went 5-1 in the tournament, losing only to eventual gold medalist Lithuania, while posting wins over Angola, Turkey, China, Finland and Israel.

Jacobson finished his first campaign at the helm of UNI with an 18-13 record. The 18 wins were the most for a first-year Panther head coach since the team joined the Division I ranks in 1980. In addition, UNI posted wins over Iowa State and Iowa - sweeping the Cyclones and Hawkeyes in the same season for just the second time ever - including posting a win in Iowa City for the first time in program history.

Before taking over as head coach, Jacobson was the Panthers' top assistant coach starting in 2001, and was a key cog in bringing the Panthers from the basement of the Missouri Valley Conference to the penthouse. With Jacobson on staff, the development of UNI basketball has been remarkable.

UNI has also advanced to the NCAA tournament seven times (2004, 2005, 2006, 2009, 2010, 2015, and 2016), including receiving two at-large bids. UNI also achieved its first-ever Division I top-25 ranking during the 2005-06 season.

On November 15, 2014, Jacobson became the all-time win leader for a coach in UNI Men's basketball history. After recording a win over his alma mater University of North Dakota, he notched his 167th UNI victory.

In the 2014-15 season, Jacobson led the Panthers to their highest ranking in school history (#10) in the AP and (#9) in the Coaches Poll. UNI also in that season achieved the most wins in the school's history with 31. After that season Jacobson, was given a 10-year extension with an average of $900,000 per year through 2024-25.

On November 21, 2015, Jacobson led UNI to a victory over #1 North Carolina. The win was one of the biggest in program history and came in just the first meeting of the two basketball programs. The Panthers are 2-0 vs AP #1 ranked teams in program history. Just four days later the coach hit another career milestone. After defeating the University of Dubuque in convincing fashion, the coach recorded his 200th victory at the university. Nearly three weeks after achieving the 200th victory, UNI stunned #5 ranked Iowa State in the Big Four Classic in Des Moines, IA. On March 6, 2016, UNI won its fourth MVC tournament under Jacobson.

In the first round of the MVC tournament, Jacobson notched his 250th Northern Iowa career win against Evansville on March 1, 2018.

On March 5, 2020, Jacobson was named MVC coach of the year.

On February 27, 2021, Jacobson earned his 300th career Northern Iowa victory with a double overtime win over Illinois State in the regular season finale.

On March 3, 2022, Jacobson was named the MVC coach of the year for the 5th time. The award gave Jacobson the most coach of the year award honors of any coach in the history of the 115 year history of Missouri Valley Conference.

Head coaching record

References

External links

 Northern Iowa profile

1970 births
Living people
American men's basketball coaches
American men's basketball players
Basketball coaches from North Dakota
Basketball players from North Dakota
Maccabiah Games basketball players of the United States
North Dakota Fighting Hawks men's basketball coaches
North Dakota Fighting Hawks men's basketball players
North Dakota State Bison men's basketball coaches
Northern Iowa Panthers men's basketball coaches
People from Traill County, North Dakota
Guards (basketball)
21st-century American Jews